Tim Smyczek was the defending champion, but he lost to Sam Groth in the semifinals. Adrian Mannarino won the tournament, defeating Sam Groth 3–6, 7–6(8–6). 6–4 in the final.

Seeds

Draw

Finals

Top half

Bottom half

References
 Main Draw
 Qualifying Draw

Knoxville Challenger
Knoxville Challenger